The Roman Catholic Archdiocese of Montevideo is an archdiocese of the Latin Church of the Roman Catholic church in Uruguay.

History
Erected as the Apostolic Vicariate of Montevideo by Pope Gregory XVI on 14 August 1832, the vicariate was promoted to the Diocese of Montevideo on 13 July 1878 by Pope Leo XIII.  It was elevated to the rank of a metropolitan archdiocese on 14 April 1897.

The new archdiocese became the Metropolitan of the suffragan sees: Canelones, Florida, Maldonado–Punta del Este, Melo, Mercedes, Minas, Salto, San José de Mayo, Tacuarembó.

Montevideo is the only archdiocese in Uruguay and its archbishop is thus seen as leader of the Uruguayan Church. The archdiocese's mother church and thus seat of its archbishop is the Montevideo Metropolitan Cathedral.

The current archbishop of Montevideo is Daniel Sturla, SDB, who was installed on 9 March 2014. A year later he was created Cardinal by Pope Francis.

Organization
The Archdiocese is subdivided into ten Pastoral Zones.

Bishops

List of Ordinaries of Montevideo
Pedro Alcántara Jiménez, OPraem (1830–1843)
Jacinto Vera y Durán (1859–1881)
Inocencio María Yéregui (1881–1890)
Mariano Soler (1891–1908)
Juan Francisco Aragone (1919–1940)
Antonio María Barbieri, OFM Cap (1940–1976) (Cardinal in 1958)
Carlos Parteli Keller (1976–1985)
José Gottardi Cristelli, SDB (1985–1998)
Nicolás Cotugno Fanizzi, SDB (1998–2014)
Daniel Fernando Sturla Berhouet, SDB (2014 – ) (Cardinal in 2015)

Coadjutor archbishops
Antonio María (Alfredo) Barbieri, O.F.M. Cap. (1936-1940); future Cardinal
Carlos Parteli Keller (1966-1976)

Auxiliary bishops
Innocenzo María Yéregui (1881), appointed Bishop here
Ricardo Isaza y Goyechea (1891-1929)
Pio Gaetano Secondo Stella (1893-1927)
Antonio Corso (1958-1966), appointed Bishop of Maldonado-Punta del Este
Miguel Balaguer (1962-1966), appointed Bishop of Tacuarembó
Andrés María Rubio Garcia, S.D.B. (1968-1975) appointed Bishop of Mercedes
José Gottardi Cristelli, S.D.B. (1975-1985), appointed Archbishop here
Raúl Horacio Scarrone Carrero (1982-1987), appointed Bishop of Florid
Orlando Romero Cabrera (1986-1994), appointed Bishop of Canelones
Luis del Castillo Estrada, S.J. (1988-1999), appointed Bishop of Melo
Martín Pablo Pérez Scremini (2004-2008), appointed Bishop of Florida
Milton Luis Tróccoli Cebedio (2009-2018), appointed Bishop of Maldonado-Punta del Este
Daniel Fernando Sturla Berhouet, S.D.B. (2011-2014), appointed Archbishop here; future Cardinal
Luis Eduardo González Cedrés (2018-)
Pablo Alfonso Jourdán Alvariza (2018-)

Other priests of this diocese who became bishops
Enrico Lorenzo Cabrera Urdangarin, appointed Bishop of Mercedes in 1960
Roberto Reinaldo Cáceres González, appointed Bishop of Melo in 1962
Rodolfo Pedro Wirz Kraemer, appointed Bishop of Maldonado-Punta del Este in 1985
Alberto Francisco María Sanguinetti Montero, appointed Bishop of Canelones in 2010

See also
List of Roman Catholic dioceses in Uruguay

References

External links
 
Official site

 
Religion in Montevideo
Religious organizations established in 1832
1832 establishments in Uruguay
Roman Catholic dioceses in Uruguay
Roman Catholic Ecclesiastical Province of Montevideo
Roman Catholic dioceses and prelatures established in the 19th century